Kamýk may refer to the following places in the Czech Republic:

 Kamýk (Litoměřice District), a village in Litoměřice District
 Kamýk Castle, a castle ruins in the village
 Kamýk nad Vltavou, a village in Příbram District
 Kamýk Dam, a dam on the Vltava river in the village
 Kamýk (Prague), a cadastrial area of Prague

See also 
 Kamyk (disambiguation), several places in Poland